Coffee Talk may refer to:

 Coffee Talk (Saturday Night Live), a Saturday Night Live sketch
 Coffee Talk (video game), a 2020 visual novel